Stanley "Smokey" Otis Reddick (born December 6, 1969) is a former Canadian ice hockey goaltender.

Career
Nicknamed "Smokey" by his fans and teammates, Reddick spent his twelve-year career in the ECHL and in Europe. While in Europe, Reddick played in the Slovenian League and the Alpine League.

As a member of the Johnstown Chiefs in 1991-92, Reddick set a franchise record for single season wins (25). This record would stand unmatched for ten years when Frederic Deschênes matched Reddick's record in 2001-02. His record would later be broken by Chiefs goaltender Ryan Nie, who finished the 2007-08 ECHL season with 29 wins.

After retiring from professional hockey in 2002, Reddick played with the Ile des Chenes North Stars of the Hanover Tache Hockey League, located in Manitoba. As a member of the North Stars, Reddick led the North Stars to several early victories in the Allan Cup tournament.

International play
Reddick played for the Slovenian national team on three separate occasions: 1997, 2001, and 2002 IIHF World Championships.

Personal
Stan Reddick is the younger brother of former NHL goaltender Eldon "Pokey" Reddick. His nephew, Bryce Reddick, is a forward at Michigan Tech.

Awards
1988-89: WHL East Second All-Star Team 
1995-96: Slovenian Champion (Olimpija Ljubljana)
1996-97: Slovenian Champion (Olimpija Ljubljana)
1997-98: Slovenian Champion (Olimpija Ljubljana)
1998-99: Slovenian Champion (Olimpija Ljubljana)
1999-00: Slovenian Champion (Olimpija Ljubljana)
2000-01: World Championship Gold Medal (D1, pool B, Team Slovenia)
2002-03: Allan Cup (Ile des Chenes North Stars)

References

External links

1969 births
Black Canadian ice hockey players
Canadian ice hockey goaltenders
HDD Olimpija Ljubljana players
Slovenian ice hockey players
Ice hockey people from Toronto
Johnstown Chiefs players
Living people
Moose Jaw Warriors players
Prince Albert Raiders players
Raleigh IceCaps players
Swift Current Broncos players
Tallahassee Tiger Sharks players
Utica Devils players
Wichita Thunder players
Canadian expatriate ice hockey players in Slovenia
Canadian expatriate ice hockey players in the United States